The 1990 Afghan coup d'etat attempt occurred on March 6, 1990, when General Shahnawaz Tanai, a hardline communist and Khalqist who served as Minister of Defence, attempted to overthrow President Mohammad Najibullah of the Republic of Afghanistan. The coup attempt failed and Tanai was forced to flee to Pakistan.

Background
Tanai, who has been described alternatively as a "radical nationalist" and a "hard-line communist" of the radical Khalq faction of the People's Democratic Party of Afghanistan, was fiercely anti-mujahideen yet launched an unlikely alliance with hardline Islamic fundamentalist rebel Gulbuddin Hekmatyar of the Hezb-e Islami Gulbuddin party. Tanai was against Najibullah's peace plans and supported a military solution to the conflict. Hekmatyar ordered his fighters to intensify their attacks against the Kabul regime in support of Tanai. The success of the coup was taken for granted. A previous coup attempt by Khalqists was foiled in December 1989, to which Tanai has been linked. The coup occurred a year following the Soviet withdrawal from Afghanistan.

Tanai was apparently also supported by those important Khalqists who remained in the Politburo, Assadullah Sarwari and Sayed Mohammad Gulabzoy, respectively their country's envoys to Aden and Moscow. They were said to have been intimately connected with the coup and with Tanai. Sarwari, an old comrade of Tanai, was the chief of the Afghan intelligence (KHAD) under Nur Muhammad Taraki. He was a Khalqist hardliner known as the assassin of a rival Parcham faction member. Gulabzoy was minister of interior before being exiled on a diplomatic assignment to Moscow.

Tanai stated that he didn't disagree with President Najibullah's views, but rather with his policy on the military.

Najibullah was transferring all the privileges of the Army to the tribal militias and in particular to his special guard. I was against this because the Afghan Army was losing efficiency.

The Pakistan government's involvement in this abortive affair was transparently obvious. Prime Minister Benazir Bhutto's plea to the other six party leaders to aid Tanai and Hekmatyar was rebuked as a disgrace to the jihad. Most of the factions viewed General Tanai as an opportunistic war criminal and hardline communist who was responsible for carpet-bombings in portions of the major western city of Herat in March 1979. The coup attempt was partially financed by Osama bin Laden, who bribed Afghan Armed Forces officers into deserting.

Coup attempt
Tanai ordered air strikes against government buildings. Jets flown by Afghan Air Force pilots loyal to Tanai flew in Kabul to bomb the targets, but most were repelled by the Army. Air Force Commander Abdul Qadir Aqa was an accomplice. Three rockets landed near the Presidential Palace. However the expected uprising by the Afghan Army didn't take place: Tanai had no direct control of troops inside Kabul. Tanai had sent the 15th Tank Brigade into the city to attack the Palace. Interior Minister Mohammad Aslam Watanjar played a major role in halting the coup plotters. He ordered a battalion to intercept the tanks and told his forces to capture Tanai "dead or alive". There was street fighting near the palace as well.

President Najibullah appeared on television at 10 p.m. the same night to prove that he was physically there and in effective control of the state apparatus. The President gathered the support of important Parchamite militias, including the elite Special Guard to defuse the plot.

Najibullah later claimed that the Soviet Union offered help to defeat the coup, to which he thanked the offer and replied: "There's no need now. But if we face a foreign attack that will be another matter", referring to Pakistan.

Aftermath
In the afternoon of March 7, Tanai escaped to Bagram Air Base and fled by helicopter to Peshawar, Pakistan where he was greeted and publicly accepted as an ally by Hekmatyar. Eventually, he settled there in Pakistan, where he lived in exile until August 4. A general and two commanders loyal to Tanai were killed during the coup attempt.

Najibullah grew even more suspicious of Khalqists, and thus another purge occurred, further deepening the rift between the two factions. In all, 127 Khalqist military officers were arrested for the attempted coup, including Sarwari and Gulabzoy. Twenty-seven officers escaped and later showed up at a press conference with Hekmatyar in Peshawar. Former Minister of Tribal Affairs, Bacha Gul Wafadar and Minister of Civil Aviation Mohammad Hasan Sharq were among the conspirators. General Watanjar was awarded a four-star rank and became the new Minister of Defence following his efforts against the coup plotters.

References

1990s coups d'état and coup attempts
1990 in Afghanistan
Military coups in Afghanistan
1990 in military history
Conflicts in 1990
Coup d'état attempts in Asia
Afghanistan–Pakistan relations